Wiwat Thaijaroen (Thai วิวัฒน์ ไทยเจริญ), is a Thai futsal Winger, and a member of  Thailand national futsal team. He plays  for Department of Highways Futsal Club in Futsal Thailand League.

References

Wiwat Thaijaroen
1990 births
Living people
Wiwat Thaijaroen
Wiwat Thaijaroen
Southeast Asian Games medalists in futsal
Competitors at the 2013 Southeast Asian Games